The 16th Kansas Volunteer Cavalry Regiment was a cavalry regiment that served in the Union Army during the American Civil War and American Indian Wars.

Service
The 16th Kansas Volunteer Cavalry Regiment was organized at Leavenworth, Kansas from November 1863 through May 1864. It mustered in for three years under the command of Colonel Werter R. Davis. The regiment was attached to District of Kansas, Department of Missouri, to April 1865. District of the Plains, Department of Missouri, to December 1865. The 16th Kansas Cavalry mustered out of service on December 6, 1865.

Detailed service
Duty in the District of North Kansas at Fort Leavenworth until September 1864. Company D at Fort Scott, 1st Brigade, District South Kansas. Companies A and L at Paola, 2nd Brigade, District South Kansas. Company B at Shawnee Mission and Company C at Olathe, 2nd Brigade, District of South Kansas. Companies F and G at Lawrence August 1864. Action at Ridgley, Missouri, June 11, 1864 (Company E). Scout from Leavenworth to Weston, Missouri, June 13–16, and from Kansas into Missouri June 16–29. Camden Point July 13 (Company F). Near Lexington October 17 (Company H). Second Battle of Lexington October 19. Operations against Price's Raid. Battle of Little Blue River October 21. Pursuit of Price October 21–28. Independence and State Line October 22. Big Blue and Westport October 23. Mine Creek, Little Osage River and Marias Des Cygnes October 25. Battle of Charlot October 25. Mound City and Fort Lincoln October 25 (Companies A and D). Second Battle of Newtonia October 28. Operations on Upper Arkansas January 28-February 9, 1865. Protecting country against Indians until June. Powder River Expedition, march from Fort Laramie, Dakota Territory to the Powder River then to Fort Connor, July 11 - September 20. Actions with Indians September 1–10 on Powder River. Mustered out December 6, 1865.

Casualties
The regiment lost a total of 110 men during service; 1 officer and 10 enlisted men killed or mortally wounded, 1 officer and 98 enlisted men died of disease.

Field Officers
 Colonel Werter R. Davis
 Lieutenant Colonel Samuel Walker
 Major James A. Price
 Major James Ketner
 Major Clarkson Reynolds
 Major Wilber F. Woodworth

See also

 List of Kansas Civil War Units
 Kansas in the Civil War

References
 Dyer, Frederick H. A Compendium of the War of the Rebellion (Des Moines, IA: Dyer Pub. Co.), 1908.
 Official Military History of Kansas Regiments During the War for the Suppression of the Great Rebellion (Leavenworth, KS: W. S. Burke), 1870.
Attribution

External links
 History of the 16th Kansas Cavalry by the Museum of the Kansas National Guard

Military units and formations established in 1863
Military units and formations disestablished in 1865
Units and formations of the Union Army from Kansas
1863 establishments in Kansas